Puerto Rico Highway 184 (PR-184) is a main, rural highway that connects Patillas to Cayey, Puerto Rico, with plans to be extended to Cidra. Sometimes referred to as Pork Highway, it is the main and only access to the various famous roasted-pork restaurants in the area of Guavate and the access to the Carite State Forest. It borders the Guavate or Carite River, where several people swim often, and like Puerto Rico Highway 181, it borders the man-made Carite Lake, and it meets its end at Puerto Rico Highway 3. The main antennas of the local TV stations Telemundo, WAPA-TV and Univision can be seen from this road in La Santa. The road passes near a point where five municipalities share a border – Cayey, Patillas, San Lorenzo, Caguas and Guayama.

Major intersections

See also

 List of highways numbered 184

References

External links
 

184